Goûgaram  is a town and commune in the Arlit Department of the Agadez Region of northern-central Niger. As of 2011, the commune had a total population of 6,549 people.

References

External links
Satellite map at Maplandia

Communes of Niger
Agadez Region